Achvaich is a remote crofting settlement in the Dornoch, Achvaich Sutherland area and is within the Scottish council area of Highland.

References

Populated places in Sutherland